Junior Majeur is a Canadian sports drama film, directed by Éric Tessier and released in 2017. A sequel to the 2012 film The Pee-Wee 3D: The Winter That Changed My Life (Les Pee-Wee 3d: L'hiver qui a changé ma vie), the film centres on Janeau Trudel (Antoine Olivier Pilon) and Joey Boulet (Rémi Goulet), who are now playing for the Chicoutimi Saguenéens of the Quebec Major Junior Hockey League and hopeful of getting chosen in the NHL Entry Draft, while Julie (Alice Morel-Michaud) has given up on hockey due to the reduced opportunities for female players at the higher levels of the sport, and is now a junior sports reporter with the local newspaper.

The film's cast also includes Normand Daneau, Claude Legault, Patrice Robitaille, Madeleine Péloquin and Edith Cochrane.

The film premiered at the Abitibi-Témiscamingue International Film Festival on October 28, 2017, before opening commercially on November 23.

The film won the Public Prize at the 20th Quebec Cinema Awards.

References

External links

2017 films
Canadian ice hockey films
Canadian drama films
Films directed by Éric Tessier
Films set in Quebec
French-language Canadian films
2010s Canadian films